Momisis melanura is a species of beetle in the family Cerambycidae. It was described by Gahan in 1901. It is known from Australia.

References

Astathini
Beetles described in 1901